Arvij (also Romanized as Arvīj; also known as Ārbīj, Arvīch, Arbīch, Ārwīch, and Azvench) is a village in Kahshang Rural District, in the Central District of Birjand County, South Khorasan Province, Iran. At the 2016 census, its population was 46, in 18 families.

References 

Populated places in Birjand County